Still Public Enemy #1 is a mixtape by rapper Beanie Sigel released October 31, 2006. It reached Number 192 on The Billboard 200, #18 on Billboard's "Top Independent Albums", #34 on "Top R&B/Hip-Hop Albums" and #14 on "Top Rap Albums". After releasing the mixtape, Sigel expressed regret that he did not wait to market it through Koch Records, as he felt the successful release "should’ve put a couple million dollars in my pocket".

Tracks
"Bigface Gary Intro" (featuring Bigface Gary) – 2:13
"Slim Chances Intro" (featuring Slim Chance) – 0:31
"Let Go" – 3:34
"Da Rain" (featuring Mook Jones) – 3:40
"Who Shot You" (featuring Mook Jones) – 3:44
"Same Ole Thang" – 2:29
"Beans Is Back" (featuring Mook Jones) – 3:40
"Ain't the Same" (featuring  Mook Jones and Yung World) – 3:34
"All Nite" (featuring  Mook Jones and Yung World) – 4:03
"They Not Us" – 3:14
"All Eyes on State" (featuring Mook Jones) – 3:29
"Philly's Finest" (featuring E. Ness and Mook Jones) – 3:16
"Slim Chances Outro" (featuring Slim Chance) – 0:24
"Bigface Gary Outro" (featuring Bigface Gary) – 1:36

Personnel
Slim Chance – performer
Bigface Gary – performer
George Geurin – mastering
Mook Jones – performer
E. Ness – performer
Beanie Sigel – performer
Yung World – performer

Charts

References

External links

2006 mixtape albums
Beanie Sigel albums